Thomas Denton may refer to:
Thomas Denton (died 1558), English lawyer and politician
Sir Thomas Denton (died 1633), English landowner and politician
Thomas Denton (MP for Leicester), in 1407 and 1414, MP for Leicester
Thomas Denton (Shortland Street)
Tom Denton (rugby union) (born 1988), English rugby union player
Tom Denton (footballer) (born 1989), English footballer